The 1904 Tour de France was the 2nd edition of Tour de France, one of cycling's Grand Tours. The Tour began in Paris on 2 July and Stage 3 occurred on 13 July with a flat stage to Toulouse. The race finished at the Parc des Princes in Paris on 23 July.

Stage 1
2 July 1904 — Paris (Montgeron) to Lyon, 

Lucien Pothier and César Garin were disqualified after the Tour and Pierre Chevalier was eliminated after the stage.

Stage 2
9 July 1904 — Lyon to Marseille,

Stage 3
13 July 1904 — Marseille to Toulouse,

References

1904 Tour de France
Tour de France stages